Radiolucina is a genus of bivalves belonging to the family Lucinidae.

Species
 Radiolucina amianta (Dall, 1901)
 Radiolucina cancellaris (Philippi, 1846)
 Radiolucina jessicae Garfinkle, 2012
 Radiolucina katherinepalmerae (Weisbord, 1964)

References

  Britton, J.C. (1972). Two new species and a new subgenus of Lucinidae (Mollusca: Bivalvia), with notes on certain aspects of lucinid phylogeny. Smithsonian Contributions to Zoology. 129: 1–19.
 Taylor J. & Glover E. (2021). Biology, evolution and generic review of the chemosymbiotic bivalve family Lucinidae. London: The Ray Society
 Coan, E. V.; Valentich-Scott, P. (2012). Bivalve seashells of tropical West America. Marine bivalve mollusks from Baja California to northern Peru. 2 vols, 1258 pp.

Lucinidae
Bivalve genera